The 2015 Army Black Knights football team represented the United States Military Academy  as an independent in the 2015 NCAA Division I FBS football season. The Black Knights were led by second-year head coach Jeff Monken and played their home games at Michie Stadium.

Schedule

Game summaries

Fordham

at UConn

Wake Forest

at Eastern Michigan

at Penn State

Duke

Bucknell

at Rice

at Air Force

Tulane

Rutgers

vs. Navy

References

Army
Army Black Knights football seasons
Army Black Knights football